Tatsiana Zaretskaya is a cofounder and leader of a software firm, Laava Tech. Zaretskaya was nominated to the Belarusian United Transitional Cabinet in September 2022, with responsibility for Finance and Economy. On 2 November 2022, she announced that she had resigned from the United Transitional Cabinet of Belarus as a result of weeks of threats to family, friends and employees.

Childhood and studies
Tatsiana Zaretskaya has training as a lawyer.

Laava Tech
At the age of 23, Zaretskaya was co-founder and chief executive officer of Laava Tech, a software firm based in Tallinn that develops software for minimising the use of energy in the use of LEDs for indoor farming. Zaretskaya describes Laava Tech's system as providing a fully automated system for controlling lighting, air flows and irrigation, using Internet of things sensors for monitoring.

United Transitional Cabinet
On 9 September 2022, Zaretskaya was announced as the member of the Belarusian United Transitional Cabinet responsible for Finance and Economy.

Two months later, on 2 November 2022, Zaretskaya announced her resignation from her position in the United Transitional Cabinet of Belarus because of threats to people around her. She stated that there had been "a barrage of anonymous messages, letters, calls, direct threats" to "friends, relatives, employees" and "partners and investors" of her company. Zaretskaya felt that given the alternatives of retaining her position or resigning, she judged that retaining her position would have caused more damage to Belarusian society than resigning. She stated that several of the harassers had been traced and were being dealt with by police and justice system.

Following the threats, Zerkalo and Nasha Niva tried to interview Zaretskaya about the threats, and about the technology, revenue and success of her business Laava Tech. Zaretskaya accepted an interview with Zerkalo, but only answered questions about the threats to her, her family and employees. Zerkalo stated that Zaretskaya had avoided providing any detailed answers concerning Laava Tech in the live interview and in a later written interview. Zerkalo stated that the Cabinet had launched an internal investigation into Zaretskaya's Laava Tech business; this was denied by Aliaksandr Azarau.

Nasha Niva stated that it didn't receive any response from Tsikhanousakaya's office regarding the method of selecting Zaretskaya for the Cabinet position. According to Nasha Niva, Zaretskaya stated in an interview that she refused Nasha Niva the right to publish anything about her or her interests without consulting with her and her lawyers. Based on its investigation, Nasha Niva expressed scepticism about the technological claims and the financial success of Laava Tech.

Sexism
According to Zaretskaya, people around her were sceptical about her chance of success in creating Laava Tech because she was "too young" and "a woman". She described the problem of being seen as aggressive because being active, "hustl[ing] a lot" was contrary to the stereotype according to which women are expected to "be nice".

Recognition
Zaretskaya was included in a Forbes 30 Under 30 list in 2020 and in an Innovators Under 35 list in 2022.

References

Living people
Belarusian businesspeople
Belarusian politicians
Year of birth missing (living people)